Buha may refer to:

 Buha, the home area of the Ha people in Kigoma Region, Tanzania
 Buha, a tributary of the river Sterminos in Romania
 Buha (surname)

See also